Southeast State Correctional Complex, formerly the Otter Creek Correctional Center, is a medium-security prison located in Wheelwright, Kentucky. The facility is owned by CoreCivic and is operated by the Kentucky Department of Corrections. The prison has housed both male and female inmates at different times, from Kentucky and from Hawaii. The prison opened in 1981.

In 2008, a secretarial employee of the center fatally shot herself in the office of then-warden Joyce Arnold, raising questions about how the weapon had been smuggled in past security.  Amid other allegations of mismanagement and poor medical care, Hawaii removed its 168 female inmates from Otter Creek beginning in 2009 over multiple charges of sexual abuse.

Kentucky removed its state inmates from Otter Creek in 2012.  The facility remained vacant from 2012 until 2020.

On October 18, 2019, Kentucky Governor Matt Bevin announced that the Commonwealth of Kentucky would enter into a ten-year agreement with CoreCivic to lease and reopen the facility. The prison, which was renamed the Southeast State Correctional Complex, will be operated and staffed by the Kentucky Department of Corrections and will be managed under the same rules and procedures as state owned prisons. The prison reopened in September 2020 and currently houses male inmates.

References

External links
 Southeast State Correctional Complex

Buildings and structures in Floyd County, Kentucky
Prisons in Kentucky
CoreCivic
1981 establishments in Kentucky
2012 disestablishments in Kentucky
2020 establishments in Kentucky